Mitointeractome is a mitochondrial protein interactome database.

References

External links
Mitointeractome

Molecular biology